The Last Bewitchment is the second studio album by the French gothic band Penumbra, released on June 22, 2002 under  Season of Mist.

Track listing 
 "Neutral" – 04:46
 Priestess of My Dreams" – 05:19
 The Last Bewitchement" – 05:12
 "Moaning on Earth" – 05:15
 "Insurrection" – 04:28
 "Testament" – 07:05
 "The Young Martyr" – 05:10
 "A Torrent of Tears" – 05:34
 "Pie Jesu" – 02:31

Personnel

Penumbra 
Jarlaath – vocals, oboe
Dorian	– guitars (lead, acoustic and rhythm)
Agone – bass, vocals (clean and backing)
Néo – guitars (acoustic and rhythm)
Zoltan	– keyboards, programming
Medusa	– vocals (soprano)
Garlic	– drums, percussion

Additional musicians 
Akemi Hirosaki	vocals (soprano)
Maria Moreno – vocals (mezzo-soprano)
Bruno Carry – vocals (tenor)
Stéphane Hézode – vocals (tenor)
Martial Olivier – vocals (alto, baritone)
Jack Bird – vocals (bass)
Anne Tremoulet – violin
Sandra Kares – violin
Magali Prevot – viola
Mika Gouinguene – cello
Anita Covelli	vocals (lead) (track 6), vocals (additional) (track 2)
Franck Kobolt	guitars (additional)
Corrosive Bob	guitars (additional)

Production 
Terje refsnes	producer (additional), mixing
Zoltan	– conductor (orchestra), arrangements (orchestra), engineering (other instruments, vocals), Mixing
Néo – conductor (orchestra), arrangements (choirs), mixing
Medusa	– conductor (choirs), arrangements (choirs)
Arnaud Chipouka – engineering (bass, guitars)
Franck Chipouka – engineering (bass, guitars), Photography, artwork
Ulf Horbelt – mastering
Dorian	– lyrics

References

External links 
Metallum Archvies
Discogs.com

2002 albums
Penumbra (band) albums
Season of Mist albums